Imperial Consort Boknyeong Gwi-in of the Cheongju Yang clan (27 September 1882 – 30 May 1929) (복녕당 귀인 양씨), was a consort of Emperor Gojong of Korea. Her personal name was Yang Chun-gi (양춘기, 梁春基). 

She entered Deoksugung Palace as a court lady on March 10, 1905. After the birth of the Princess Deokhye on May 25, 1912, she received the title "Boknyeong" (복녕, 福寧). Lady Yang died on May 30, 1929 and is buried at Seosamreung, in Goyang, Gyeonggi Province.

Family
 Father
 Yang Eon-hwan (양언환, 梁彦煥)
 Husband
 Gojong of Korea (8 September 1852 - 21 January 1919)
 Daughter
 Princess Deokhye (25 May 1912 – 21 April 1989) (덕혜옹주)  
 Son-in-law: Count Sō Takeyuki (16 February 1908 - 22 April 1985) (소 다케유키, 宗 武志)
 Granddaughter: Countess Sō Masae (소 마사에, 宗 正惠), or Sō Jeonghye (소 정혜) (14 August 1932 - 1956)
 Grandson-in-law: Sō Noboru (소 노보루, 宗 昇) (5 September 1931 - ?)

References 

1882 births
1929 deaths
Royal consorts of the Joseon dynasty